Gennady Korotkevich (Hienadź  Karatkievič, ; born 25 September 1994) is a Belarusian competitive programmer who has won major international competitions since the age of 11, as well as numerous national competitions. His top accomplishments include six consecutive gold medals in the International Olympiad in Informatics as well as the world championship in the 2013 and 2015 International Collegiate Programming Contest World Finals. As of December 2022, Gennady is the highest-rated programmer on CodeChef, Topcoder,  and HackerRank. In January 2022, he achieved a historic rating of 3979 on Codeforces, becoming the first to break the 3900 barrier.

Biography

Korotkevich was born in Gomel (Homiel), southeastern Belarus. His parents, Vladimir and Lyudmila Korotkevich, are programmers in the mathematics department at Francysk Skaryna Homiel State University. At age 6, he became interested in his parents' work. When he was 8, his father designed a children's game he could use to learn programming.

His mother consulted departmental colleague Mikhail Dolinsky, who gave Korotkevich a small book to read. Dolinsky, one of the top computer science teachers in Belarus, recalled, "A month went by, and then another one... No news from Gena. Then suddenly Lyudmila comes by and brings me a programming notebook: when summer and football were over, her son sat at the computer. As a second-grader at a national competition, he took second place, which gained him an automatic entry into a technical university without taking any entrance exams. Somehow he solved the problem of a body immersed in water. At that time, Gena didn't even know about Archimedes' principle of buoyancy."

Korotkevich first gained global attention when he qualified for the 2006 International Olympiad in Informatics (IOI) at the age of 11, a world record by a large margin.

He took the silver medal at his first IOI event and received gold medals from 2007 to 2012. To date, he is the most successful competitor in IOI's history.

At the 2009 IOI in Plovdiv, the then 14-year-old Korotkevich said of his success, "I try various [strategies], and one of them is the right one. I am no genius. I am simply good at it." He said he spent no more than three to four hours each day at the computer, and his preferred hobbies are football and table tennis.

In the fall of 2012, he moved to Russia to attend ITMO University. In the summer of 2013, he helped ITMO defeat Shanghai Jiao Tong University and the University of Tokyo to win the 37th International Collegiate Programming Contest World Finals, held in St. Petersburg. He also won the annual Google Code Jam from 2014 to 2020.

In a 2014 interview, Korotkevich said he was unsure of his career plans after graduation, saying he'd focus on his education and possibly go into science.

In a 2017 interview, Korotkevich said he had received job offers from Google and Yandex, but that he had turned them down and would instead continue with his degree in computer science at ITMO.

In 2019, Korotkevich was a PhD student at ITMO.

Career achievements 
A more comprehensive list of achievements can be found at the Competitive Programming Hall Of Fame website.
 Facebook Hacker Cup: 2014, 2015, 2019, 2020 winner
 Topcoder Open: 2018, 2019 Marathon Match Champion, 2014, 2019, 2020, 2021 Algorithm Champion
 Google Hash Code: champion 2019, 2020 and 2021 2nd place - Team name- Past Glory
 Google Code Jam: 2014 champion, 2015 champion, 2016 champion, 2017 champion, 2018 champion, 2019 champion, 2020 champion, 2021 6th place and 2022 champion 
In Round 1B of the 2012 Google Code Jam, he achieved a perfect score in just 54 minutes, 41 seconds from the start of the contest.
 Yandex.Algorithm: 2010, 2013, 2014, 2015 winner, 2017 winner and 2018 winner
 Yandex Cup: 2020 winner 
 Russian Code Cup (by Mail.Ru Group): 2016 winner, 2015 runner-up, 2014 winner, 2013 runner-up
 ACM-ICPC World Finals: 2013 winner (team)  and 2015 winner (team)
 Kotlin Challenge: 2014 winner
 International Olympiad in Informatics: He won absolute first place in 2009, 2010, 2011; a gold medal in 2007 (20th place), 2008 (7th place) and 2012 (2nd place); a silver medal in 2006 (26th place). Currently he holds the record for quantity of gold medals (six) and absolute first places (three).
 All-Russian Team Olympiad in Informatics: 2007, 2009, 2010 and 2011 winner and 2008 runner-up
 Topcoder High School Competition: 2010 winner, 2009 runner-up
Snarknews Winter Series: 2010, 2011, 2012, 2013, 2014 and 2015 winner
Snarknews Summer Series: 2008, 2010, 2011 runner-up and 2012, 2013, 2014 winner
Vekua Cup: 2013 winner (team)
CROC Championship: 2013  and 2016 winner 
 Internet Problem Solving Contest: 2011 winner (team), 2013 winner (team) and 2017 winner (team) 
 Challenge24: 2013 and 2014 runner-up (team)
 Marathon24: 2015 3rd place (team)
 Deadline24: 2016 3rd place (team), 2017 winner (team) and 2018 winner (team)
In 2015, he participated at IMC and was awarded a gold medal, ranking 47 as individual, and 10th position as a member of ITMO University team.
  Code Festival Grand Final: Code Festival Final 2016 2nd place (individual), Code Festival Final winner 2017 (individual)
 Bioinformatics Contest: 2017 and 2019 winner, 2018 3rd place.
 ICFP Programming Contest: 2021 winner (team)

Codechef Snackdown :
 Codechef Snackdown 2016 Winner (team)
 Codechef Snackdown 2019 winner (team)

 Codeforces powered tournaments
 Rockethon — 2014, 2015 winner
 ZeptoCodeRush - 2014 third place, 2015 winner
 Looksery Cup — 2015 winner
 VK Cup: 2012 3rd place (individual), 2015 winner (team), 2016 1st place (team).

See also 
 Central European Olympiad in Informatics
 Online judge
 Petr Mitrichev
Makoto Soejima
Benjamin Qi

References

External links 
Online coding profiles
 Topcoder: tourist
 Codeforces: tourist
 CodeChef: gennady.korotkevich
 Google Code Jam: (2015, 2014, 2013, 2012, 2011, 2010, 2009)
 SPOJ: tourist
 HackerEarth: @gennady
 Hackerrank: @Gennady
 AtCoder: tourist

1994 births
ITMO University alumni
Living people
People from Gomel
Belarusian computer programmers
Competitive programmers